The 1967 Italian Grand Prix was a Formula One motor race held at the Autodromo Nazionale di Monza on 10 September 1967. It was race 9 of 11 in both the 1967 World Championship of Drivers and the 1967 International Cup for Formula One Manufacturers. The race was won by British driver John Surtees driving a Honda. It was the sixth and final career victory for Surtees, as well as the first ever race for the Honda RA300 which he drove to victory. This was the first Formula One race where start lights were used.

This race is considered one of Jim Clark's greatest performances in Formula One. He led the race until lap 12 when he picked up a puncture and lost an entire lap. He then spent the next 48 laps recovering through the field, taking the lead on lap 60, and pulled away. But on the final lap, a lack of fuel in Clark's Lotus 49 allowed Jack Brabham and Surtees to pass the Scotsman and finish first and second, with Surtees ahead by less than a car length at the line. This was the second victory for the Honda F1 team, and the last for the factory team until Jenson Button won the 2006 Hungarian Grand Prix.

Classification

Qualifying

Race

Championship standings after the race

Drivers' Championship standings

Constructors' Championship standings

 Notes: Only the top five positions are included for both sets of standings.

References

Italian Grand Prix
Italian Grand Prix
European Grand Prix
1967 in Italian motorsport